
Gmina Szumowo is a rural gmina (administrative district) in Zambrów County, Podlaskie Voivodeship, in north-eastern Poland.

Villages
Gmina Szumowo contains the villages and settlements of Głębocz Wielki, Kaczynek, Kalinowo, Krajewo-Budziły, Łętownica, Mroczki-Stylongi, Ostrożne, Paproć Duża, Paproć Mała, Pęchratka Polska, Radwany-Zaorze, Rynołty, Srebrna, Srebrny Borek, Stryjki, Szumowo, Wyszomierz Wielki, Żabikowo Prywatne, Żabikowo Rządowe and Zaręby-Jartuzy.

Neighbouring gminas
Gmina Szumowo is bordered by the gminas of Andrzejewo, Ostrów Mazowiecka, Śniadowo, Stary Lubotyń and Zambrów.

References

External links
Polish official population figures 2006

Szumowo
Zambrów County